Eoophyla mindanensis is a moth in the family Crambidae. It was described by Speidel in 1998. It is found in the Philippines (Mindanao).

References

Eoophyla
Moths described in 1998